Frederic Addison McGrand (July 5, 1895 – September 3, 1988) was a Canadian physician and politician.  Born in Keswick Ridge, New Brunswick, he received his education at St. Thomas College and his medical degree from McGill University.

McGrand served as a member of the council for Queens County from 1927 to 1937. In 1935, he was elected to the Legislative Assembly of New Brunswick for Queens. From 1939 to 1944, he was the Speaker of the Legislative Assembly. From 1944 to 1952, he was the Minister of Health and Social Services. McGrand represented Sunbury County in the provincial assembly from 1939 to 1952.

In 1955, he was summoned to the Senate of Canada representing the senatorial division of Sunbury, New Brunswick. A Liberal, he resigned in 1988.

McGrand also published several books including:
 Backward glances at Sunbury and Queens, New Brunswick Historical Society, 1967
 Hurry Doctor: experiences of Dr. Fred A. McGrand among patients, friends and politicians, 1986

References

External links
 

1895 births
1988 deaths
McGill University Faculty of Medicine alumni
New Brunswick Liberal Association MLAs
Speakers of the Legislative Assembly of New Brunswick
Canadian senators from New Brunswick
People from York County, New Brunswick
New Brunswick municipal councillors
Liberal Party of Canada senators